= Vinod Naranat =

Vinod Naranat is an Indian ventriloquistand ex-magician who does social awareness programs all around the world.

He has done more than 5,700 campaigns and has been to 9 countries.

== Life ==
Naranat, who hails from Ernakulam, began his career as a magician. After a meeting with ventriloquist Prahaladacharya in 1987, he chose to pursue a career as ventriloquist.

"Kitty", Naranat's monkey puppet, is talking to spectators with jokes and naughty comments to interact with people. Kitty became popular, after its creator Naranat took up social issues. To create awareness among the public, the government and non-government organizations are using Kitty shows as a tool. Several corporate business organizations are also using Kitty shows for the promotion of their products and services.
